"Akashlina" is one of the most well-known poems written by Indian poet Jibanananda Das. It was composed in the late 1930s, and was first published in 1940 in a verse collection named Satti Tarar Timir.

Transliteration and translation

Background
"Akashlina" was composed by Das in the late 1930s when he was living in Calcutta, after he lost his position as Assistant Lecturer at the City College. The relevant manuscript was discovered and labelled Book-9 while being preserved in the National Library of Calcutta. The poem occurs on page 12 of the manuscript. It was first published in December 1940 in a verse collection named Satti Tarar Timir, and was also included in the 1940 collection Modern Bengali Poetry. It is the first poem of his third collection of poetry published in 1942 under the title Akashlina.

Translation into English
Starting with Das himself, Akashlina has been translated into English many times. Translators include Martin Kirkman, Puroshuttam Das with Shamosri Das, P. Lal, Mary Lago in collaboration with Tarun Gupta,  Chidananda Dasgupta, Ananda Lal, Clinton B. Seely, Sukanta Chaudhuri, Anupam Banerjee, Hayat Saif, Faizul Latif Chowdhury, Fakrul Alam, Anjana Basu, Joe Winter, Ron. D K Banergjee, Joydeep Bhattacharya, Arun Sarker, and Amitabha Mukerjee. In some cases, translations differ from the translation of Das himself.

See also
Banalata Sen, a poem by Jibanananda Das

References

Further reading
 IOO Bangla Premer kobita by Samresh Majumder
 Kabbo Somachar by Bangla Academy
 5 Modern Poets by Sahittomala

External links
 Lyrics in Bengali
 Translation by Joudeep Bhattacharya
  Translation by Ron. D K Banergjee
 A Bengali Web-site on poet Jibanananda Das (Archived 2009-10-24)

Bengali poetry
Works by Jibanananda Das